Otter River may refer to:

North America
Otter River (Northwest Branch Saint John River tributary), in Quebec, Canada, and Maine, US
Otter River (Ontario)
Otter River (Massachusetts)
Otter River, a village in Templeton, Massachusetts
Otter River (Michigan)
Otter River (Minnesota)
Otter River (Virginia)
Sweet Grass Creek, or Otter River, in Montana

United Kingdom
River Otter, Devon, England

See also
River otter (disambiguation)
Otto River, in New Zealand's South Island